Julian Reinard (born 5 March 1983) is a German former professional footballer who played as a goalkeeper.

Career
Reinard first appeared in the Bundesliga on 21 March 2004 while SC Freiburg's first and second keepers had been injured. A year later, media and trainer looked upon him as the future number one of Freiburg, but his disastrous effort during a 0–7 defeat against Bayern Munich and the following massive public criticism terminated these ambitions.

While plying his trade at Hakoah Amidar/Ramat Gan on 23 October 2006 he became the first German footballer ever to play a professional match in Israel. Due to problems with his groin he quit Ramat Gan and, after a brief spell at FC Wil was without a team.

References

Living people
1983 births
Association football goalkeepers
German footballers
Hakoah Maccabi Amidar Ramat Gan F.C. players
Rainrd, Julian
Rainrd, Julian
SC Freiburg players
Bundesliga players
Israeli Premier League players